This is a list of counties of the Kingdom of Hungary, which are fully or partially located in present-day Slovakia.

The territory of present-day Slovakia was part of the Kingdom of Hungary until 1920. See History of Slovakia.

Counties that are completely incorporated in Slovakia
There were 20 (earlier 21) counties of the Kingdom of Hungary situated completely or partly in present-day Slovakia. After the creation of Czechoslovakia, they continued to exist until 1922. Most are still referred to informally.

Counties that are partly included in Slovakia

See also 

List of historic counties of Hungary
List of tourism regions of Slovakia
Regions of Slovakia

External links
 Former names of all Slovakia´s towns and villages prior IWW (prior 1918)

Slovakia
Counties, traditional

de:Liste der historischen Komitate Ungarns#Komitate in der heutigen Slowakei